Paula Isabel da Silva Moreira (born January 4, 1975) is a neuroscientist and Assistant Professor of Physiology at the University of Coimbra. Moreira is recognized in the field of Alzheimer's disease research particularly for her work on bioenergetics.

Moreira is Senior Editor of Journal of Alzheimer's Disease and recipient of Stimulus for Research prize in 2003 by the Calouste Gulbenkian Foundation. She also received the L'Oreal for Women in Science award (2008) supported by L'Oreal Portugal/UNESCO/Foundation for Science and Technology (FCT).

Education 
Moreira received her PhD in Biomedical Sciences from University of Coimbra in 2007.

Research focus 
Moreira's research is primarily focused on the impact of neurodegenerative conditions on brain function with special focus on bioenergetics. The physiologic process of aging and the pathologic process of diabetes have also been studied by Moreira as important risk factors for neurodegeneration.

Notes

External links 
 Alzheimer Research Forum Profile

Alzheimer's disease researchers
Living people
Portuguese neuroscientists
Portuguese women neuroscientists
Portuguese women scientists
Academic staff of the University of Coimbra
1975 births